The Powell Formation or Powell Dolomite is a geologic formation in northern Arkansas, southeast Missouri and Virginia. It contains gastropod, cephalopod, and trilobite fossils dating back to the Ordovician Period.

See also

 List of fossiliferous stratigraphic units in Arkansas
 List of fossiliferous stratigraphic units in Missouri
 List of fossiliferous stratigraphic units in Virginia

References

 

Ordovician Arkansas
Ordovician Missouri
Ordovician geology of Virginia
Ordovician geology of Tennessee
Ordovician southern paleotemperate deposits
Ordovician southern paleotropical deposits